The 2011 Coleman Vision Tennis Championships was a professional tennis tournament played on hard courts. It was the twelfth edition of the tournament, which is part of the 2011 ITF Women's Circuit. It took place in Albuquerque, New Mexico, United States, between 19 and 25 September 2011.

WTA entrants

Seeds

 1 Rankings are as of September 12, 2011.

Other entrants
The following players received wildcards into the singles main draw:
  Lauren Davis
  Malou Ejdesgaard
  Jamie Hampton
  Grace Min

The following players received entry from the qualifying draw:
  Elena Bovina
  Asia Muhammad
  Jessica Roland-Rosario
  Amra Sadiković

The following players received entry by a lucky loser spot:
  Amanda Fink

Champions

Singles

 Regina Kulikova def.  Anna Tatishvili, 7–5, 6–3

Doubles

 Alexa Glatch /  Asia Muhammad def.  Grace Min /  Melanie Oudin, 4–6, 6–3, [10–2]

External links
Official Website
ITF Search 

 
Coleman Vision Tennis Championships
Coleman Vision Tennis Championships
2011 in American tennis